Lou Odle was an American football coach. He served as the head football coach at Sterling College in Sterling, Kansas for two seasons, from 1940 to 1941, compiling a record of 7–10–2.

Head coaching record

References

Year of birth missing
Year of death missing
Sterling Warriors football coaches